Clifford Couser (born May 18, 1971) is a heavyweight boxer.  Nicknamed "The Black Bull" and often "Twin Tyson" for his resemblance to Mike Tyson, Couser fought several contenders from his era. Couser has also claimed numerous times to be the half brother of Mike Tyson.

Professional career
Couser turned pro in 1993 and has   beaten notable fighters, such as James "Quick" Tillis, Jorge Luis Gonzalez and Monte Barrett.

His career peak was 25-10, until he lost to former light Heavyweight and Heavyweight champion Michael Moorer and went 1-11 after that. He has won the Utah State Heavyweight title and also the North American Heavyweight titles.

Outside the Ring
Couser played Mike Tyson in the HBO film Don King: Only in America.
He has a son by the name of Sky Christopher King who resides in Rosedale, Mississippi and a daughter by the name of Shae Moore who lives in Las Vegas.

Professional boxing record

|-
|align="center" colspan=8|26 Wins (14 knockouts), 22 Losses, 2 Draws, 2 No Contests
|-
| align="center" style="border-style: none none solid solid; background: #e3e3e3"|Result
| align="center" style="border-style: none none solid solid; background: #e3e3e3"|Record
| align="center" style="border-style: none none solid solid; background: #e3e3e3"|Opponent
| align="center" style="border-style: none none solid solid; background: #e3e3e3"|Type
| align="center" style="border-style: none none solid solid; background: #e3e3e3"|Round
| align="center" style="border-style: none none solid solid; background: #e3e3e3"|Date
| align="center" style="border-style: none none solid solid; background: #e3e3e3"|Location
| align="center" style="border-style: none none solid solid; background: #e3e3e3"|Notes
|-align=center
|Loss
|
|align=left| Billy Zumbrun
|KO
|4 
|21/01/2012
|align=left| 
|align=left|
|-align=center
|Loss
|
|align=left| Joe Hanks
|KO
|1 
|10/02/2010
|align=left| 
|align=left|
|-align=center
|Loss
|
|align=left| John Hopoate
|TKO
|4 
|20/03/2009
|align=left| 
|align=left|
|-align=center
|Loss
|
|align=left| Travis Kauffman
|KO
|1 
|07/02/2009
|align=left| 
|align=left|
|-align=center
|Loss
|
|align=left| Solomon Haumono
|UD
|8
|27/08/2008
|align=left| 
|align=left|
|-align=center
|Loss
|
|align=left| Cedric Boswell
|TKO
|2 
|12/07/2008
|align=left| 
|align=left|
|-align=center
|Loss
|
|align=left| Johnnie White
|UD
|8
|28/06/2008
|align=left| 
|align=left|
|-align=center
|Loss
|
|align=left| Chris Arreola
|TKO
|1 
|09/02/2008
|align=left| 
|align=left|
|-align=center
|Loss
|
|align=left| Monte Barrett
|TKO
|2 
|06/12/2007
|align=left| 
|align=left|
|-align=center
|Loss
|
|align=left| Tony Thompson
|TKO
|2 
|27/09/2007
|align=left| 
|align=left|
|-align=center
|Win
|
|align=left| Monte Barrett
|TKO
|2 
|07/07/2007
|align=left| 
|align=left|
|-align=center
|Loss
|
|align=left| Rob Calloway
|TKO
|2 
|10/05/2007
|align=left| 
|align=left|
|-align=center
|Loss
|
|align=left| Michael Moorer
|KO
|1 
|09/12/2006
|align=left| 
|align=left|
|-align=center
|Win
|
|align=left| Troy Beets
|TKO
|4 
|07/04/2006
|align=left| 
|align=left|
|-align=center
|style="background:#ddd;"|NC
|
|align=left| Andrew Greeley
|ND
|5 
|08/07/2005
|align=left| 
|align=left|
|-align=center
|Loss
|
|align=left| Volodymyr Vyrchys
|TKO
|5 
|26/06/2004
|align=left| 
|align=left|
|-align=center
|Loss
|24-9-2
|align=left| Malcolm Tann 
|DQ
|1 
|11/07/2003
|align=left| 
|align=left|Couser was disqualified in round 1 for slamming Tann & attempting to hit him while he was on the mat.
|-align=center
|Win
|24-8-2
|align=left| Karl Evans
|TKO
|3 
|09/05/2003
|align=left| 
|align=left|
|-align=center
|Loss
|23-8-2
|align=left| Lance Whitaker
|KO
|5 
|13/10/2002
|align=left| 
|align=left|
|-align=center
|Win
|23-7-2
|align=left| Vladyslav Andreyev
|TKO
|5 
|16/02/2002
|align=left| 
|align=left|
|-align=center
|Win
|22-7-2
|align=left| James Johnson
|KO
|2 
|06/12/2001
|align=left| 
|align=left|
|-align=center
|Loss
|21-7-2
|align=left| Willie Chapman
|PTS
|10
|21/09/2001
|align=left| 
|align=left|
|-align=center
|Win
|21-6-2
|align=left| Anthony Moore
|UD
|10
|29/03/2001
|align=left| 
|align=left|
|-align=center
|Loss
|20-6-2
|align=left| Clifford Etienne
|TKO
|3 
|09/09/2000
|align=left| 
|align=left|
|-align=center
|Win
|20-5-2
|align=left| Jorge Luis Gonzalez
|TKO
|3 
|05/08/2000
|align=left| 
|align=left|
|-align=center
|Win
|19-5-2
|align=left| Dale Crowe
|UD
|10
|11/06/2000
|align=left| 
|align=left|
|-align=center
|Win
|18-5-2
|align=left| Bradley Rone
|UD
|8
|12/05/2000
|align=left| 
|align=left|
|-align=center
|Win
|17-5-2
|align=left| Rodney McSwain
|UD
|8
|10/02/2000
|align=left| 
|align=left|
|-align=center
|Loss
|16-5-2
|align=left| Wesley Martin
|PTS
|8
|22/04/1999
|align=left| 
|align=left|
|-align=center
|Loss
|16-4-2
|align=left| Mike Sedillo
|SD
|8
|07/03/1999
|align=left| 
|align=left|
|-align=center
|Win
|16-3-2
|align=left| Everett Martin
|UD
|10
|01/10/1998
|align=left| 
|align=left|
|-align=center
|Win
|15-3-2
|align=left| Lorenzo Boyd
|KO
|4 
|11/06/1998
|align=left| 
|align=left|
|-align=center
|Win
|14-3-2
|align=left| Derrick Roddy
|KO
|2 
|23/04/1998
|align=left| 
|align=left|
|-align=center
|Win
|13-3-2
|align=left| Gary Tompkins
|PTS
|6
|21/11/1997
|align=left| 
|align=left|
|-align=center
|Win
|12-3-2
|align=left| Bomani Parker
|PTS
|10
|28/10/1997
|align=left| 
|align=left|
|-align=center
|Win
|11-3-2
|align=left| Frankie Hines
|KO
|2 
|16/10/1997
|align=left| 
|align=left|
|-align=center
|Win
|10-3-2
|align=left| Kevin Smalls
|KO
|1 
|16/08/1997
|align=left| 
|align=left|
|-align=center
|style="background:#ddd;"|NC
|9-3-2
|align=left| Keith McMurray
|NC
|9 
|10/05/1997
|align=left| 
|align=left|
|-align=center
|Win
|9-3-2
|align=left| James Tillis
|TKO
|6 
|30/08/1996
|align=left| 
|align=left|
|-align=center
|Win
|8-3-2
|align=left| Marco Dickson
|PTS
|6
|22/04/1996
|align=left| 
|align=left|
|-align=center
|Win
|7-3-2
|align=left| Marco Dickson
|PTS
|6
|18/03/1996
|align=left| 
|align=left|
|-align=center
|Loss
|6-3-2
|align=left| Carlos Monroe
|PTS
|6
|12/02/1996
|align=left| 
|align=left|
|-align=center
|Win
|6-2-2
|align=left| Craig Brinson
|KO
|1 
|11/12/1995
|align=left| 
|align=left|
|-align=center
|style="background:#abcdef;"|Draw
|5-2-2
|align=left| John Bray
|PTS
|6
|15/09/1995
|align=left| 
|align=left|
|-align=center
|Win
|5-2-1
|align=left| Krishna Wainwright
|PTS
|4
|09/05/1995
|align=left| 
|align=left|
|-align=center
|Loss
|4-2-1
|align=left| Jeff Williams
|PTS
|6
|24/05/1994
|align=left| 
|align=left|
|-align=center
|Win
|4-1-1
|align=left| Ken Kirkwood
|PTS
|6
|01/04/1994
|align=left| 
|align=left|
|-align=center
|Loss
|3-1-1
|align=left| Brian LaSpada
|PTS
|6
|02/02/1994
|align=left| 
|align=left|
|-align=center
|Win
|3-0-1
|align=left|Chris Walker
|KO
|3 
|24/01/1994
|align=left| 
|align=left|
|-align=center
|Win
|2-0-1
|align=left| Lopez McGee
|KO
|1 
|20/11/1993
|align=left| 
|align=left|
|-align=center
|Win
|1-0-1
|align=left| Ray Kipping
|PTS
|4
|27/09/1993
|align=left| 
|align=left|
|-align=center
|style="background:#abcdef;"|Draw
|0-0-1
|align=left| Ron Williams
|PTS
|4
|31/07/1993
|align=left| 
|align=left|
|-align=center

References

External links
 

1971 births
Living people
Boxers from St. Louis
American male boxers
Heavyweight boxers